Sodium sorbate is the sodium salt of sorbic acid.  It is an unstable white solid. Unlike other sorbic acid salts such as potassium sorbate (E202) and calcium sorbate (E203), the use of sodium sorbate as a food additive is not allowed in the EU due to potential genotoxic effects.

Its E-number is E201.

References

Organic sodium salts
Sorbates